In enzymology, a 6-oxohexanoate dehydrogenase is an enzyme that catalyzes the chemical reaction

6-oxohexanoate + NADP+ + H2O  adipate + NADPH + 2 H+

The 3 substrates of this enzyme are 6-oxohexanoate, NADP+, and H2O, whereas its 3 products are adipate, NADPH, and H+.

This enzyme belongs to the family of oxidoreductases, specifically those acting on the aldehyde or oxo group of donor with NAD+ or NADP+ as acceptor.  The systematic name of this enzyme class is 6-oxohexanoate:NADP+ oxidoreductase. This enzyme participates in caprolactam degradation.

References

 
 

EC 1.2.1
NADPH-dependent enzymes
Enzymes of unknown structure